Ōmi (AOE-426) is the second ship of the s of the Japanese Maritime Self-Defense Force. She was commissioned on 3 April 2006.

Construction and career
She was laid down on 7 February 2003 and launched on 19 February 2004. Commissioned on 3 April 2006 with the hull number AOE-426.

Gallery

References

External links

Auxiliary ships of the Japan Maritime Self-Defense Force
Ships built by Hitachi Zosen Corporation
Mashū-class replenishment ships
2004 ships